Elizabeth Alexandra Morton Breese Tilton (August 19, 1883 – January 15, 1964) was an American philanthropist, based on Long Island, New York. The Elizabeth A. Morton National Wildlife Refuge is named for her.

Early life 
Elizabeth Alexandra Morton was born in 1883, the daughter of Alexander Logan Morton and Mary E. Barber Morton. Her father was a West Point graduate from Virginia, who became a lawyer in New York and founder of the Shinnecock Hills Golf Club on Long Island.

Career 
After her second divorce, Morton resumed her birth name, moved into her parents' property, and donated almost two hundred acres on Long Island to the United States Fish and Wildlife Service in the mid-1950s. The Elizabeth A. Morton National Wildlife Refuge is named for her, and was the first national wildlife refuge named for a woman (the three others are named for Rachel Carson, Elizabeth S. Hartwell, and Julia Butler Hansen). She donated additional land to the Nature Conservancy in 1957, which became part of the Wolf Swamp Reserve.

Personal life 
Morton married twice. Her first husband was Sidney Salisbury Breese, son of James L. Breese; they married in 1907 and divorced in 1919. Her second husband was businessman Newell Whiting Tilton, son of educator Frederic W. Tilton; they married in 1921, and later divorced. Elizabeth Alexandra Morton died in 1964, aged 80 years, in Southampton.

References

External links 

 "Miss Elizabeth Morton (daughter of Mr. Alexander Logan Morton of New York)" two photographs by Rudolf Eickemeyer Jr., in the collection of the National Museum of American History.

1883 births
1964 deaths
American philanthropists
People from Southampton (town), New York